Pleasantview may refer to:

 Pleasantview, Edmonton, a neighborhood in Edmonton, Alberta, Canada
 Pleasantview Township, Michigan, USA
A neighborhood in the computer games The Sims and The Sims 2.

See also
 Pleasant View (disambiguation)